Eligio Vecchi (16 February 1910 – 8 November 1968) was an Italian professional footballer who played as a midfielder.

Career 
Vecchi began his career at local club Mantova in 1927, before joining Foggia two seasons later in the Serie B. Following a few seasons with Cremonese, Vecchi played two friendlies for Milan in May 1934, against Admira Wien and Manchester City. He joined Ambrosiana-Inter, Milan's rivals, in the Serie A, scoring four goals in 29 games in his two seasons at the club.

He was sold to Alessandria in 1936 where, despite being relegated to the Serie B, Vecchi remained at the club. Alessandria failed to gain promotion, and Vecchi moved to Fiorentina in 1938, who had just been relegated from the Serie A. Vecchi then played for Atalanta, Mantova, and Cavese, before being forced to fight in the ongoing World War II. He returned to play for Mantova ahead of the 1946–47 season, where he retired.

Playing style 
Vecchi was a forward with good technique, capable of playing both as a centre-forward and as a wide midfielder, though his main position was that of a winger.

Honours 
Fiorentina
 Serie B: 1938–39

Atalanta
 Serie B: 1939–40

References

1910 births
1968 deaths
Sportspeople from Mantua
Italian footballers
Association football forwards
Association football wingers
Association football midfielders
Mantova 1911 players
Calcio Foggia 1920 players
U.S. Cremonese players
Inter Milan players
U.S. Alessandria Calcio 1912 players
ACF Fiorentina players
Atalanta B.C. players
Cavese 1919 players
Serie A players
Serie B players
Serie C players
Serie D players
Italian military personnel of World War II
Footballers from Lombardy